Calcutta Public School is the given name of a group of privately owned and administered all-grade co-educational primary, secondary and higher secondary schools providing education from Lower Nursery to Class - 12, in eastern India. These comprise two schools: one in Kolkata in Baguiati and the other in Ranchi Ormnanji. The Kolkata branch is affiliated with the Council for the Indian School Certificate Examinations (CICSE) and the Ranchi branch is affiliated with the Central Board of Secondary Education (CBSE).

References

External links
http://calcuttapublicschool.in

Primary schools in West Bengal
High schools and secondary schools in Kolkata
Educational institutions in India with year of establishment missing